Arnaud Aubert (died 11 June 1371) was nephew of Pope Innocent VI, who appointed him Bishop of Agde (1354), then Bishop of Carcassonne (1354–57) and finally Archbishop of Auch (from January 1357 until his death). He was Camerlengo of the Holy Roman Church from March 1361 and exercised that post during a sede vacante in 1362 and 1370. He was later vicar and administrator of the see of Avignon 1366–1367. He died at Avignon.

External links
 Gallica
 Biography about Arnaud Aubert : Obediences.net, Lieux, Acteurs et Polémiques du Grand Schisme d'Occident (1378-1430)

1371 deaths
Bishops of Agde
Archbishops of Auch
Bishops of Carcassonne
14th-century Roman Catholic archbishops in France
Apostolic Camera
Camerlengos of the Holy Roman Church
Year of birth unknown
Arnaud